Flannel is a woollen (or other) cloth.

Flannel may also refer to:

Textiles 
 In the UK, flannel generally refers to a washcloth
 Flannels, cricket attire originally made of flannel
 Flannel vest

Other uses 
 Flannel, a networking component of CoreOS

 "Flannel", a 2018 song by Justin Timberlake from Man of the Woods